The Matariki Network of Universities (MNU) is an international group of universities that focuses on strong links between research and undergraduate teaching. Each member is leading international best practice in research and education based on long academic traditions. The MNU was established in 2010 to enable universities to enhance diversity, to share ideas and expertise, and to learn international best practice from each other, recognising the shared commitment to an ethos of excellence in research, scholarship and rounded education.

Name and research activities
Matariki in the Māori language designates the Pleiades star cluster, also known as the Seven Sisters. It reflects seven founding member universities in the MNU.

Potential activities for the newly formed network include:

 enhanced student exchange
 joint postgraduate programmes
 social-responsibility projects
 research collaboration
 conferences and workshops on topics of mutual interest
 visiting fellowships
 faculty and staff exchange and secondments
 benchmarking and sharing of best practice
 cultural and sporting activities

Universities
As of September 2010 the founding members of the Matariki Network of Universities are:

References

External links
Official website

Dartmouth College
Durham University
University of Otago
University of Tübingen
University of Western Australia
Uppsala University
International college and university associations and consortia
Queen's University at Kingston